Tazuko (written: ,  or ) is a feminine Japanese given name. Notable people with the name include:

, Japanese table tennis player
Tazuko Ichikawa (born 1941), American artist
, Japanese swimmer
, Japanese film director

Japanese feminine given names